Brad Nelson may refer to:

Brad Nelson (baseball) (born 1982), American baseball player
Brad Nelson (gamer), American video game player

See Also
Bradley Nelson (born 1962), American robotist